The 1956 Milwaukee Braves season was the fourth in Milwaukee and the 86th overall season of the franchise. The Braves finished in second place in the National League, just one game behind the Brooklyn Dodgers in the league standings, and one game ahead of the  All three teams posted wins on the final day of the season; the Braves had entered the final three games with a game advantage, but dropped the first two at St. Louis while the Dodgers swept the Pirates.

The Braves' led the major leagues in home attendance with 2,046,331; next closest was the New York Yankees of the American League at under  The runner-up in NL attendance was champion Brooklyn at under  The Braves averaged 30,093 for the

Regular season

Season summary 
After a loss on Saturday, June 16, the owners dismissed him and replaced him with  who led the Braves to a  record for the rest of the season. Haney managed the Braves to the World Series in 1957 and 1958, and then to a tie atop the National League standings in 1959, tied with the Los Angeles Dodgers.

In individual performance statistics, outfielder Hank Aaron led the league in hits with 200, in batting average at .328, and in doubles with 34. His 106 runs scored led the Braves. First baseman Joe Adcock led the Braves with 38 home runs and 103 runs batted in. The Braves' other hitting star was their third baseman, Eddie Mathews, who played in 151 games, hit 37 home runs, scored 103 runs, and batted in 95 runs.

The pitching leaders for the Braves were their "big three" starting pitchers (listed with their won-loss records): Warren Spahn, Lew Burdette, and Bob Buhl. Spahn also recorded three saves among the four games in which he was used as a relief pitcher.

Outfielder Bobby Thomson also had his best season, out of three, with the Braves, with 142 games played, 20 home runs, and 74 runs batted in, but just a .235 batting average. Then, the next season, Thomson was traded back to the New York Giants.

Season standings

Record vs. opponents

Roster

Player stats

Batting

Starters by position 
Note: Pos = Position; G = Games played; AB = At bats; R = Runs; H = Hits; Avg. = Batting average; HR = Home runs; RBI = Runs batted in

Other batters 
Note: G = Games played; AB = At bats; H = Hits; Avg. = Batting average; HR = Home runs; RBI = Runs batted in

Pitching

Starting pitchers 
Note: G = Games pitched; IP = Innings pitched; W = Wins; L = Losses; ERA = Earned run average; SO = Strikeouts

Other pitchers 
Note: G = Games pitched; IP = Innings pitched; W = Wins; L = Losses; ERA = Earned run average; SO = Strikeouts

Relief pitchers 
Note: G = Games pitched; W = Wins; L = Losses; SV = Saves; ERA = Earned run average; SO = Strikeouts

Farm system 

LEAGUE CHAMPIONS: Atlanta, Jacksonville, Evansville, Boise, Wellsville

References 

1956 Milwaukee Braves season at Baseball Reference

Milwaukee Braves seasons
Milwaukee Braves season
Milwau